David Andrew Gregory (born August 19, 1985) is an American actor and writer. He portrayed Robert Ford on the soap opera One Life to Live from 2009 until the show ended in 2012. He wrote and produced “Powder Burns”, the scripted Western podcast starring John Wesley Shipp as a blind sheriff, which premiered on Apple Podcasts in 2015 to rave reviews and earned Gregory a Voice Arts Award in 2017. On TV, he was a recurring actor on The Good Fight, Insatiable, Constantine, and Deception.

Career
Gregory was born and raised in Fairbanks, Alaska as the middle of three sons. He danced at North Star Ballet and did plays with Fairbanks Drama Association and Fairbanks Light Opera Theater. In the summer of 2003, prior to his senior year of high school, Gregory attended Interlochen Arts Camp and took home one of the institution's top honors, The Maddy Award for Excellence in Musical Theater, for his role as the Fairy Godmother in Sweet Charity.

He began his collegiate study at Baldwin-Wallace College (now Baldwin Wallace University), where appeared as Owen in Brian Friel's Translations, Oberon in A Midsummer Night's Dream, and as Creon in Seamus Heaney's Burial at Thebes, for which he won the theater department's award for Best Actor in a Play.

David made his professional debut in 2005 at Porthouse Theater as Riff in West Side Story. During college, he also appeared as Ferdinand in The Tempest for Great Lakes Theater Festival and its sister company, Idaho Shakespeare Festival.

In 2008, he graduated with a Bachelor of Music in Music Theater from Baldwin-Wallace College (now Baldwin Wallace University). The same year, he earned his Equity card while appearing in The Full Monty for the now-defunct American Musical Theater of San Jose. 

David began a two-week stint on ABC's One Life to Live in the summer of 2009. He was offered a contract that fall and stayed with the show until its cancellation. After One Life to Live ended in 2012, Gregory guest-starred on multiple television series, including a season-long arc on the short-lived NBC series Deception. In 2014, he appeared in Hartford Stage's Vanya and Sonia and Masha and Spike, earning a Connecticut Critics Circle Award nomination and gracing the cover of American Theater Magazine in the role the next year. 

David's audio Western “Powder Burns” took home the Voice Arts Award for Outstanding Storytelling/Best Performance for an episode dealing with Alzheimer's disease. John Wesley Shipp and Ed Asner starred opposite Gregory in the episode. Western Writers of America hailed the production as “Darn Good Entertainment. The Future of Westerns.”

Gregory's play Hank & Jim Build a Plane was work-shopped at The Last Frontier Theater Conference in Valdez, Alaska. The comedy follows cinematic legends and best friends Henry Fonda and James Stewart as they reminisce about everything from their days as struggling actors in New York to their detrimental feud over politics and The Hollywood blacklist. Gregory signed an option agreement with SunnySpot Productions in May 2019 and work-shopped at Le Petit Théâtre Du Vieux Carré in New Orleans.

Recently, his semi-autobiographical screenplay Christmas on Farewell Avenue won Best Feature Holiday Story at the 2020 Silver State Film Festival.

David lives and works in New York City, with his wife, Broadway performer Jennifer Noble. They have been together since college.

References

External links

 

1985 births
Living people
21st-century American male actors
Male actors from Alaska
American male soap opera actors
American male television actors
Baldwin Wallace University alumni
Male models from Alaska
Writers from Fairbanks, Alaska